Ganei Modi'in is an Israeli settlement in the West Bank. Located just over the Green Line to the north of Modi'in-Maccabim-Re'ut, it falls under the jurisdiction of Mateh Binyamin Regional Council.

The international community considers Israeli settlements in the West Bank illegal under international law, but the Israeli government disputes this.

History
Plans to establish the settlement were announced by the regional council in 1982 and it was founded in March 1985. Originally part of Hashmonaim, in 1996 it was merged into Modi'in Illit. However, on 1 January 2016, it was officially recognised as a separate jurisdiction.

References

Israeli settlements in the West Bank
Mateh Binyamin Regional Council
Populated places established in 1985
1985 establishments in the Israeli Civil Administration area
Community settlements